Fernando Vallejo Rendón (born 1942 in Medellín, Colombia) is a Colombian-born novelist, filmmaker and essayist. He obtained Mexican nationality in 2007.

Biography

Vallejo was born and raised in Medellín, though he left his hometown early in life. He started studies in Philosophy at Universidad Nacional de Colombia in Bogotá, but after one year he abandoned the Faculty of Philosophy and Letters. Soon after he began new studies on biology at the Universidad Javeriana in Bogotá, which he finished. Then he spent one year in Italy at the film academy Cinecittà, where he obtained basic notions on cinema.

Vallejo then returned to Colombia with the project of filmmaking. Yet after difficulties with the Colombian Government in producing and, after he produced it, in presenting his first film (it was censored), he decided to leave his country.

In Mexico he produced and distributed three films about the violence in Colombia. He also wrote an award-winning children's theater script, "El reino misterioso o Tomás y las abejas." He has been living in Mexico since 1971, where he not only produced his cinematographic pieces, but also the whole of his literary work. Despite time spent in other locales, mainly Europe and the United States, most of his novels take place in Colombia. Some of his themes are grammar, biology, philosophy, physics, violence, pederasty, adolescence, drugs, death and politics, mostly related to places such as Antioquia and Medellín; yet his main theme is his life. His books are written in first person, in an autobiographical style, although he manipulates the conventions of autobiography such that the line between autobiography and fiction becomes significantly blurred.

His best-known novel, La virgen de los sicarios, has been translated into English as Our Lady of the Assassins. It deals with his fictionalized return to Medellín, and his relationships with two teenagers caught in the local cycle of violence. The autobiographical/fiction La virgen de los sicarios was made into a full feature film in 2000 and released in the United States as Our Lady of the Assassins.

In 2003, Colombian filmmaker Luis Ospina made a feature-length documentary about him: "La desazón suprema: retrato incesante de Fernando Vallejo ("The Supreme Uneasiness: Incessant Portrait of Fernando Vallejo").

In April 2007, Vallejo obtained Mexican citizenship and published a letter in which he publicly renounced his Colombian nationality. The letter presents the reasons for his decision by mentioning several incidents during his career, among them the recent reelection of President Álvaro Uribe, that eventually led him to this decision.

Vallejo is openly gay and lives with his partner, scenographist David Antón. He is known as an animal rights defender and vegan, and because of his antinatalist views, he has no children. He is an atheist and fiercely critical of religion.

Selected works
 "El reino misterioso o Tomás y las abejas" - [The Mysterious Kingdom, or, Thomas and the Bees] (1975). In Pilo Tamirano Luca: 2o. Concurso Nacional de Obras de Teatro. México, DF: IMSS.
 Logoi: una gramática del lenguaje literario (1983) 
 Barba Jacob, el mensajero (1984) 
 The Blue Days - Los días azules (1985) 
 The Secret Fire - El fuego secreto (1987) 
 The Roads to Rome - Los caminos a Roma (1988) 
 Years of Indulgence - Años de indulgencia (1989) 
 El mensajero (1991) 
 Among ghosts - Entre fantasmas (1993) 
 La virgen de los sicarios - [Our Lady of the Assassins](1994) 
 Chapolas negras (1995) 
 The Darwinist Tautology - La tautología darwinista (1998)
 The Precipice - El desbarrancadero (2001) 
 Rambla Paralela - "La rambla paralela" (2002) 
 My Brother the Mayor - Mi hermano el alcalde (2003) 
 Brief Handbook of Impostorology in Physics - "Manualito de imposturología física" (2005)
 The Whore of Babylon - "La puta de Babilonia" (2007) 
 White Crow - "Cuervo Blanco" (2012) 

He received the Rómulo Gallegos Prize in 2003, one of the most prestigious prizes for Literature in the Spanish language for El desbarrancadero and, protesting the political climate in Venezuela, donated the cash from the award to Caracas's dogs.
Acceptance speech at the Rómulo Gallegos prize, in Spanish:

Interviews
"La sinceridad puede ser demoledora" Ciberletras, 13. Lehman University.

See also
List of Colombian writers

References

External links
"10 Most Influential Ibero American Intellectuals" of the year 2012. Foreign Policy magazine 
 
 Revista Semana;  A su estilo, con humor negro, el escritor Fernando Vallejo renuncia a la nacionalidad colombiana

1942 births
Colombian biologists
Colombian emigrants to Mexico
Colombian film directors
20th-century Colombian novelists
21st-century Colombian novelists
Colombian male novelists
Mexican biologists
Mexican film directors
Mexican novelists
Mexican male screenwriters
Living people
People from Medellín
Gay novelists
Gay screenwriters
Colombian gay writers
Colombian LGBT novelists
Colombian LGBT screenwriters
Mexican gay writers
Mexican LGBT novelists
Mexican LGBT screenwriters
Anti-natalists
Critics of religions
Colombian atheists
Mexican atheists